CNAC may refer to:

China National Aviation Corporation
Canadian Numbering Administration Consortium
Centro Nacional Autónomo de Cinematografía
 Centre National d'Art Contemporain, Grenoble, France; located at the Le Magasin
 Centre National des Arts du Cirque, Châlons-en-Champagne, Marne, Grand Est, France

 CNAC House, Hong Kong International Airport, Hong Kong, China; HQ for Air China
 Cambridge Nonviolent Action Committee, part of the Cambridge movement (civil rights)
 Covington Neighborhood Action Coalition, see History of Covington, Kentucky

See also